Wagingera is a village in the Shorapur taluka of Yadgir district in Karnataka state, India.  Wagingera is famous for its fort that played decisive role during the Siege of Wagingera.  Wagingera Fort is 5 km west of Shorapur city.

Demographics
 census, Wagingera had 2,757 inhabitants, with 1,368 males and 1,389 females.

See also
 Bonal Bird Sanctuary
 Shorapur
 Yadgir
 Shahapur, Karnataka

References

External links
 http://yadgir.nic.in/

Villages in Yadgir district